Sovinj-e Olya (also Romanized as Sovīnj-e ‘Olyā; also known as Sovīch-e Bālā) is a village in Barvanan-e Gharbi Rural District, Torkamanchay District, Meyaneh County, East Azerbaijan Province, Iran. At the 2006 census, its population was 40, in 9 families.

References 

Populated places in Meyaneh County